Willer is a given name. Notable people with the given name include:

Willer Bordon (1949–2015), Italian, academic, businessman and former politician
Willer Souza Oliveira (born 1979), Brazilian professional football player

See also
Willer (surname)
Willer (disambiguation)